Freixianda, Ribeira do Farrio e Formigais is a civil parish in the municipality of Ourém, Portugal. It was formed in 2013 by the merger of the former parishes Freixianda, Ribeira do Farrio and Formigais. The population in 2011 was 3,693, in an area of 64.23 km².

References

Freguesias of Ourém